Richard Kaser (born c. 1933) was a Canadian football player who played for the BC Lions and Ottawa Rough Riders. He won the Grey Cup with Ottawa in 1960. He played college football for the University of Toledo.

References

1930s births
Ottawa Rough Riders players
Living people